Staro Selo Topusko is a village in central Croatia, in the municipality of Topusko, Sisak-Moslavina County.

History
During World War II, a large number of Serbs were massacred in the village by the Ustaše regime in June and July 1941.

Demographics
According to the 2011 census, the village of Staro Selo Topusko has 154 inhabitants. This represents 38.31% of its pre-war population according to the 1991 census.

According to the 1991 census,  68.16% of the village population were ethnic Serbs (274/402), 29.60% were ethnic Croats (119/402), 1.49% were Yugoslavs (6/402) and 0.75% were of other ethnic origin (3/402).

Sights
 Monument to the uprising of the people of Kordun and Banija

See also 
 Glina massacres

References

Populated places in Sisak-Moslavina County
Serb communities in Croatia